Befaqul Madarisil Arabia Bangladesh  is the largest Qawmi madrasa education board in Bangladesh. it was founded in April, 1978 after a seminar of Islamic scholars. This organization of Qawmi Madrasahs of Bangladesh is also known as the "Befaqul Madaris" (also transliterated as Wafaq ul Madaris). It is an extension of the process that formed the Wafaq ul Madaris Al-Arabia, Pakistan in 1957. "Bangladesh Qawmi Madrasah Education Board" is the largest federation of Islamic seminaries in Bangladesh. Qawmi educational system practices originate from the traditional Muslim educational system of Bangladesh. At present, there are more than 65,000 Qawmi Madrasahs in Bangladesh. As of 2013, more than 20,000 Seminaries across the People's Republic of Bangladesh are affiliated with "Befaqul Madaris". It controls all the seminaries which are run by Deobandi School of thought. Deobandi School of thought is supposed to be the most powerful and dominated school of thought in Bangladesh.

Objectives and functions

The board was founded to assure a standardized curriculum and to provide centralized examination. Membership with the board is voluntary, though required for degree accreditation by the Befaqul Madaris.

The main functions of the federation are: registration of Madrasahs, creation of syllabus, checking standard of education, arrangement of examination and issuance of degrees.

Notable institutions
The following are some of the notable Qawmi Madrasahs in Bangladesh:
 Al-Jamiatul Arabia Kachemul Uloom Kazirhat Hifz Madrasah and Orphanage
 Al-Jamiatul Ahlia Darul Ulum Moinul Islam
 Al-Jamiatul Arabia Haildhar Madrasa
 Jamia Tawakkulia Renga Madrasah
 Jamiatul Uloom Al-Islamia Lalkhan Bazar - also known as Lalkhan Bazar Madrasah
 Jamia Qurania Arabia Lalbagh
 Al-Jamiah Al-Islamiah Patiya
 Jamia Shariyyah Malibagh, Dhaka
 Jamia Rahmania Arabia Dhaka
 Jamia Darul Ma'arif Al-Islamia

See also 
 List of Deobandi organisations
 Qawmi Madrasah
 Religious education

References

Further reading
 
 
 
 

Qawmi madrasas of Bangladesh
Deobandi Islamic universities and colleges
Educational institutions established in 1978
1978 establishments in Bangladesh
Deobandi organisations